This is a list of Equipment of the Indonesian National Police currently in service.

Aircraft

Firearms 

DAPC-2 light armored vehicle made in south korea use by police paramilitary.

See also
List of equipment of the Indonesian Army
List of equipment of the Indonesian Navy
List of equipment of the Indonesian Air Force
List of aircraft of the Indonesian National Armed Forces

References

Law enforcement in Indonesia